Joseph Israel Barlow (born September 28, 1995) is an American professional baseball pitcher for the Texas Rangers of Major League Baseball (MLB). He made his MLB debut in 2021.

Amateur career
Barlow grew up in a household with eleven siblings, and attended Riverton High School in Riverton, Utah. He attended Salt Lake Community College in Salt Lake City, Utah and played college baseball for them in 2015 and 2016. During his freshman season, Barlow was a catcher and hit just .202 with zero home runs and 13 RBI. In his sophomore season, Barlow appeared at pitcher and catcher. Hitting .208 with 14 RBI. In 13 games pitched (7 starts) Barlow went 3–3 with a 2.12 ERA and 51 strikeouts over  innings pitched. The Texas Rangers selected Barlow in the eleventh round, with the 339th overall selection, of the 2016 MLB draft. He signed with them for a $85,000 signing bonus.

Professional career
After signing, Barlow  converted to full–time pitching and was assigned to the AZL Rangers of the Rookie-level Arizona League to make his professional debut; in  innings pitched for them, he posted a 2–4 record with a 4.41 ERA. He split the 2017 season between extended spring training and the Spokane Indians of the Class A Short Season Northwest League, producing a 6–1 record with a 2.00 ERA and 64 strikeouts in 45 innings. In 2018, Barlow spent the full season with the Hickory Crawdads of the Class A South Atlantic League, producing a 3–3 record with a 1.68 ERA and 91 strikeouts in 59 innings. After the 2018 regular season, Barlow played for the Surprise Saguaros of the Arizona Fall League. Barlow was assigned to the Down East Wood Ducks of the Class A-Advanced Carolina League to open the 2019 season. He went 4–0 with a 0.38 ERA and 44 strikeouts in  innings for them. On May 29, he was promoted to the Frisco RoughRiders of the Double-A Texas League, and went 1–1 with a 1.18 ERA and 27 strikeouts in 16 innings for them. On July 15, he was promoted to the Nashville Sounds of the Triple-A Pacific Coast League, and went 1–1 with a 8.83 ERA in  innings. Barlow did not play in a game in 2020 due to the cancellation of the Minor League Baseball season because of the COVID-19 pandemic. Barlow opened the 2021 season with the Round Rock Express of the Triple-A West, going 0–1 with a 2.57 ERA and 29 strikeouts over 21 innings.

On June 23, 2021, Texas selected Barlow's contract and promoted him to the major leagues for the first time. He made his MLB debut the next day, pitching a scoreless inning against the Oakland Athletics. In the game, he also notched his first career strikeout, punching out A's infielder Jed Lowrie. Barlow set a Rangers franchise record on August 2, becoming the first pitcher to record eight straight strikeouts of opposing batters faced. Barlow served as the Rangers closer to finish the 2021 season. In 2021, he posted a 0–2 record with a 1.55 ERA, 27 strikeouts, and 11 saves over 29 innings. He was named the Rangers September/October Pitcher of the Month.

Barlow spent time as the Texas closer in 2022, but ultimately lost the role due to ineffectiveness and injury. With Texas in 2022, he posted a 3–1 record with a 3.86 ERA, 28 strikeouts, and 13 saves over 35 innings.

References

External links

Salt Lake Bruins bio

1995 births
Living people
People from Riverton, Utah
Baseball players from Utah
Major League Baseball pitchers
Texas Rangers players
Salt Lake Bruins baseball players
Arizona League Rangers players
Spokane Indians players
Hickory Crawdads players
Down East Wood Ducks players
Frisco RoughRiders players
Nashville Sounds players
Surprise Saguaros players
Round Rock Express players